Hyperion Books can refer to:
 Hachette Books, book publishing division formerly known as Hyperion Books
 Disney-Hyperion, an imprint that was retained by Disney Publishing Worldwide when its division, Hyperion Books, was sold to Hachette USA publishing group
 Hyperion Books for Children, a children's imprint that was retained by Disney Publishing Worldwide when its division, Hyperion Books, was sold to Hachette USA publishing group